The 1991–92 NBA season was the Timberwolves' 3rd season in the National Basketball Association. The Timberwolves had the seventh pick in the 1991 NBA draft, and selected Australian center Luc Longley from the University of New Mexico. Under new head coach Jimmy Rodgers, the Timberwolves began their season amidst a blizzard when a one-day record  of snow fell as they lost to the Utah Jazz 112–97 on November 1. Early into the season, the team traded Tyrone Corbin to the Jazz in exchange for Thurl Bailey, as they continued to get worse with an awful 8–38 start around the All-Star Break. Their struggles continued as they went on a 16-game losing streak in March, finishing last place in the Midwest Division with a 15–67 record (.183), which remains the equal lowest winning percentage in the franchise’s history, alongside the 2009–10 Timberwolves.

Following the season, Tony Campbell was traded to the New York Knicks, and Pooh Richardson and Sam Mitchell were both dealt to the Indiana Pacers.

Draft picks

Roster

Regular season

Season standings

y - clinched division title
x - clinched playoff spot

z - clinched division title
y - clinched division title
x - clinched playoff spot

Record vs. opponents

Game log

Player statistics

References

See also
 1991-92 NBA season

Minnesota Timberwolves seasons
Timber
Timber
Monnesota